Anthony McElrea Snodgrass FBA (born 7 July 1934) is an academic and archaeologist noted for his work on Archaic Greece.

Biography
Born to William McElrea and Kathleen (Owen) Snodgrass, he gained his M.A. and D.Phil in 1963. He is Emeritus Professor in Classical Archaeology at the University of Cambridge and a specialist in Archaic Greece. He is a Fellow of Clare College and of the McDonald Institute for Archaeological Research. He chairs the British Committee for the Reunification of the Parthenon Marbles. 

He taught at Edinburgh University from 1961 to 1976 making the move down to Cambridge University in the same year. While there he was appointed the sixth Laurence Professor of Classical Archaeology from 1976 to 2001. He was elected a Fellow of the British Academy in 1979 and was Vice-President from 1990 to 1992. He currently resides in Cambridge.

Works
Early Greek Armour and Weapons, Aldine (Hawthorne, NY), 1964. 
Arms and Armour of the Greeks, Cornell University Press (Ithaca, NY), 1967, reprinted, Johns Hopkins University Press (Baltimore, MD), 1999. 
The Dark Age of Greece: An Archaeological Survey, Edinburgh University Press (Edinburgh, Scotland), 1971, Columbia University Press (New York, NY), 1972, Routledge (New York, NY), 2001.
Defensive Body Armour from Barbarian Europe Atlantic Archaeology Press (Edinburgh, Scotland), 1976. 
Archaeology and the Rise of the Greek State, Cambridge University Press (New York, NY), 1977. 
Archaic Greece: The Age of Experiment, Dent (London), 1980, Columbia University Press, 1981. 
(Contributor) Sources for Ancient History, Cambridge University Press (New York, NY), 1983. 
An Archaeology of Greece: The Present State and Future Scope of a Discipline, University of California Press (Berkeley, CA), 1987. 
Homer and the Artists: Text and Picture in Early Greek Art, Cambridge University Press, 1998. 
(Editor with Gocha R. Tsetskhladze) Greek Settlements in the Eastern Mediterranean and the Black Sea, Archaeopress (Oxford, England), 2002.
Archaeology and the Emergence of Greece, Cornell University Press (Ithaca, NY), 2006.

References
Contemporary Authors Online, Gale, 2006. Reproduced in Biography Resource Center. Farmington Hills, Mich.: Thomson Gale. 2006.

External links
 Biographical note at the British Academy website
 Picture of Anthony Snodgrass

Fellows of Clare College, Cambridge
Laurence Professors of Classical Archaeology
Fellows of the British Academy
Academics of the University of Edinburgh
People associated with the University of Edinburgh School of History, Classics and Archaeology
Living people
1934 births